Military–civilian administration:
 Civil–military administrations (Ukraine), temporary local government units in Ukraine
 Military–civilian administrations, Russian-occupation military-led regimes in Ukraine, including:
Kherson military–civilian administration
Zaporizhzhia military–civilian administration
Kharkiv military–civilian administration
Mykolaiv military–civilian administration

See also 
Civic-military dictatorship of Uruguay (1973–1985)
 Military administration (Nazi Germany), created by Germany during WW2 in occupied territories which were also known as Military administration authorities (German: Militärverwaltung)